Bteddine El Loqch, Btaddine El Loqsh, Btaddine Al Lokch, Btaddine Al Loqsh,  (Arabic:بتدين اللقش; also spelled Bteddine El Liqch) is a village in South Lebanon Governorate, Lebanon. 
The number of registered citizens reaches 830 people, with the majority belonging to the Maronite confession (around 94.6%). The town counts 80 houses and 10 shops and commercial institutions.
The most common family names are: "Kattar", "Abou Sleiman", "Eid", "Sayegh", "Abou Samra", "Akl", "Abi Nader" ...

Etymology 

The word Bteddine is believed to mean "house of religion" or "house of law". 
The word "El Loqch" (in spoken Lebanese, the pine tree pulp) was added in the 19th century by Emir Bashir Shihab II in order to differentiate the village from the town of Beit ed-Dine, capital of the Emirate of Mount Lebanon.

Geography 

It extends over an area of 3.2 Km2 surrounded by pine trees.
It is limited at the North by the village "El Harf", at the South by the village "EL Homsiye", at the west by the villages "Al Beba" and "Taid" and at the East by the village "Sabbah".

Climate 

Its temperate climate is like most of the mountainous Lebanese villages. Bteddine El Loqch gains an average of 1040 mm (40.94 in) of rainfall per year.

History & Landmarks 

An ancient grave dating from the Roman Empire, also known as "الناووس", is located to the north east of the village.

Bteddine El Loqch has an ancient church dedicated to Saint Joseph and dating from the 19th century. and lies few miles away from the Convent of Our Lady of Machmouche, one of the most important Maronite monasteries in Lebanon.

Municipality

Phone Number : +961 07 800196

It is run by a town council consisted of 9 members elected in 2016 :

 Nabil Al Kattar (Mayor)
 Georges Salemeh (Deputy Mayor)
 Maguy Eid
 Noha Eid
 Charbel Al Kattar
 Sola Akl
 Said Bou Sleiman
 Jad Akl
 Roger Abou Sleiman

And one Mukhtar "Albert Eid"

They are elected every 6 years
.

Population 

The number of registered citizens reaches 830 people, with the majority belonging to the Maronite confession (around 94.6%). The town counts 80 houses and 10 shops and commercial institutions.

Cultural & Sports Club 

Founded by a Committee in 1964, its first president was Mansour Eid, then followed by Samir Al Hajj, Nabil Kattar, Raif Kattar, Wajdi Kattar, Joe Eid, Ziad Atallah, Roger Abou Sleiman, Walid Karam, Charles Kattar, Romeo Akl, Talal Karam, Mazen Abou Samra and Christina Keryakos.

The club managed to create a Public Library containing a large variety of historical, intellectual and literary value books. It also published the first edition of the magazine "الكتاب" (Al-Kitab) in July 1967 and organized many popular festivals and events in the Jezzine region.

Notable people
 Mansour Eid, Writer
 Samir Atallah, Journalist

References

External links
  Bteddine El Liqch, Localiban

Gallery 

Populated places in Jezzine District
Maronite Christian communities in Lebanon